Benaguasil is a municipality in the Valencian Community, Spain, situated in the Camp de Túria comarca.

Geography
Benaguasil is situated at the left side of the Túria or Guadalaviar river, 25 km from Valencia. Bordering cities: Llíria, la Pobla de Vallbona, Riba-roja de Túria, Vilamarxant and Pedralba.

The traditional economy is based on agriculture with onions and oranges as important crops. But industries such as textiles and construction materials are becoming increasingly important.

The local Festes are Falles (15–20 March), and Festes de Montiel (8 September).

History
Benaguasil was built by an important Arabic family, al-Wazir, over the ruins of a Roman villa.

References

Municipalities in Camp de Túria
Populated places in Camp de Túria